Buxar is a nagar parishad city in the state of Bihar, India ,sharing border with Balia & Gazipur district of Uttar Pradesh . It is the headquarters of the eponymous Buxar district, as well as the headquarters of the community development block of Buxar, which also contains the census town of Sarimpur along with 132 rural villages.

The historic Battle of Chausa and Battle of Buxar were fought in this vicinity. Buxar Railway Station lies on Patna–Mughalsarai section of Howrah–Delhi main line in the zone of eastern central Indian railway. It is approximately 125 km from the state capital of Patna. Bhojpuri is the widely spoken language in Buxar.

Typonym 
According to local traditions, the name Buxar is derived from a lake in the town named Aghsar (effacer of Sin), which in course of time became Baghsar and took the present form that is Buxar. Another vedic legend states that, a sage or rishi named Besira transformed himself to take the look of a Tiger to frighten Durvasa rishi, and doomed by him to retain the form of Tiger forever. In order to restore his Hyman's form, Bedsira  bathed in the holy pond of Aghsar and worshipped Garushankar. To commemorate this event the spot was called Vyaghrasar and later became Baghsar (The Tiger's pond).

Demography

 India census, Buxar had a population of 102,861. Males constitute 52.65% of the population and females 47.35%. 16% of the population is under 6 years of age.

The 2011 census recorded the city of Buxar as having a literacy rate of 83.82%, with an 11.24% gap between male literacy (89.13%) and female literacy (77.89%). The whole of Buxar district had a literacy rate of 70.14%, with Buxar block (comprising both rural and urban areas) had a literacy rate of 77.45%, the highest in the district.

Geography
Buxar district occupies an area of 1,703 square kilometres.

Economy
Buxar is an important regional commercial and trade hub, with connections via road and rail along with river transport on the Ganges. Along with Dumraon, Buxar is one of the main centres for trade and industry in the district. Soap and furniture are manufactured in both cities. Major exports from Buxar include rice, paddy, gur, mango, vegetables, fish, and jail-related manufactured goods. Major imports include engineering goods and medicine.

Villages
In addition to the urban settlements of Buxar and Sarimpur, Buxar block encompasses 132 villages. Of these, 97 are inhabited and 35 are uninhabited:

The total population of these villages is 180,308, in 27,985 households.

Notable people
 Harihar Singh, Former Chief Minister of Bihar and Bhojpuri Poet.
 Bismillah Khan
 Sanjay Kumar Tiwari, Member of Legislative Assembly
 Shivnath Singh, Olympic athlete

See also
 Buxar district
 List of cities in Bihar
 George William Ziemann's missionary work in Buxar

References

Cities and towns in Buxar district